Carl Benjamin, also known by his online pseudonym Sargon of Akkad, is a British far-right anti-feminist YouTuber and political commentator. A former member of the Eurosceptic right-wing UK Independence Party (UKIP), he was one of its unsuccessful candidates for the South West England constituency in the 2019 European Parliament election.

During the Gamergate harassment campaign, Benjamin promoted the conspiracy theory that feminists were infiltrating video game research groups to influence game development. Since Gamergate, he has focused on promoting Brexit and criticising feminism, Islam, identity politics, and what he views as political correctness in the media and other institutions. Benjamin has been described as politically "right-wing" and "far-right" by multiple outlets. He denies this description of his politics, instead calling himself a "classical liberal" and a "skeptic".

In 2016, in response to politician Jess Phillips' complaint that she frequently received rape threats from men online, Benjamin tweeted to her: "I wouldn't even rape you." Criticism of this comment—and of a later remark in which Benjamin said he might rape Phillips but for the fact that "nobody's got that much beer"—dominated press coverage of his European Parliament candidacy.

YouTube career 
Benjamin's YouTube channel drew attention during the Gamergate harassment campaign in 2014. Inside Higher Ed said his videos on the topic advanced a conspiracy theory in which he argued members of the Digital Games Research Association (DiGRA) were actively plotting to influence video game development, saying DiGRA "became co-opted by feminists to become a think tank by which gender ideologues can disseminate their ideology to the gaming press and ultimately to gamers". He also posted content that was critical of feminist video game critics and academics and posted content that was critical of feminism in general. That year, Benjamin said that he had named his channel Sargon of Akkad because he was "a lover of history and the lessons it can teach us".

In June 2015, YouTube took down one of Benjamin's videos when it received a copyright claim from The Guardian. Benjamin contested the claim against the video, which used substantial portions of The Guardians video. The Guardian said it was offering "advice on how to engage with Guardian content without breaching copyright". The video was restored later the same day. One Los Angeles Times opinion columnist commented on the incident, saying it was "alarming to see copyright law used to stifle debate in the public square".

At VidCon 2017, media critic Anita Sarkeesian appeared on a panel discussing online harassment directed towards women. A group of YouTubers who had frequently criticised Sarkeesian in the past, including Benjamin, filled one half of the first three rows of the audience and filmed Sarkeesian as part of a targeted harassment campaign against her. Sarkeesian singled out Benjamin as a serial harasser of hers, calling him a "garbage human". The event went viral among both critics and supporters of Sarkeesian. Benjamin accused Sarkeesian of abuse and cyberbullying and said that he would have wanted to know how she "would like to be approached"; in a blog post, Sarkeesian wrote:

VidCon founder Hank Green issued a statement that the group's actions were clear "intimidating behaviour" and apologised for the situation "which resulted in [Sarkeesian] being subjected to a hostile environment that she had not signed up for". Patreon also investigated the claims of harassment, but determined that although they considered his actions "distasteful", Benjamin had not violated their code of conduct.

In 2017, comedian and YouTuber Akilah Hughes filed a lawsuit for copyright infringement against Benjamin for using portions of her video "We Thought She Would Win" in his video "SJW Levels of Awareness". In February 2020, the case was dismissed with prejudice and Hughes was later ordered to pay Benjamin's legal fees after her claims were found to be "objectively unreasonable".

In January 2018, Benjamin debated neo-Nazi Richard B. Spencer on the issue of scientific racism.

In March 2018, North London Antifa protesters broke into a scheduled discussion between Benjamin and Yaron Brook by King's College London's Libertarian Society at the school. Masked protestors attacked security guards, set off smoke bombs, broke windows and set off a fire alarm. The event organisers called the police, cancelled the event and evacuated the building. The organiser reported that two security guards were hospitalised.

Patreon banned Benjamin in December 2018, when he was earning over US$12,000 a month. According to Patreon, Benjamin violated the site's rules on hate speech by using "racial and homophobic slurs to degrade another individual". A number of users, including Sam Harris, Jordan Peterson, and Dave Rubin, left the platform following the ban of Benjamin, with Benjamin and Rubin moving onto Peterson's service Thinkspot. Harris stated that he did not "share the politics of the banned members," but objected to what he described as "political bias" on Patreon. As part of their explanation for why they dropped Benjamin, Patreon published a transcript of a YouTube video in which Benjamin stated that members of the alt-right were "acting like white niggers" because "Exactly how you describe black people acting is the impression I get dealing with the Alt-Right." He added that: "White people are meant to be polite and respectful to one another." Later in the video, Benjamin stated: "don't expect me to have a debate with one of your faggots." In response, Benjamin said that his targets were not black or homosexual, and claimed that the epithet "nigger" is not offensive in Britain as it is in the United States. Benjamin also claimed that the comments had been taken out of context.

In May 2019, YouTube suspended Benjamin's Sargon of Akkad channel from the YouTube Partner Program. Benjamin has also been suspended from Twitter.

Political career 
In response to Labour Party politician and Member of Parliament Jess Phillips' statement that rape threats are commonplace for her, Benjamin said in May 2016, "I wouldn't even rape you #AntiRapeThreats #FeminismIsCancer" in a YouTube video and repeated this on Twitter. He has declined to apologise for the comment. He was investigated by West Midlands Police for the comment and a police spokesperson said he was "dealt with by way of words of advice".

In June 2018, Benjamin joined the UK Independence Party (UKIP), along with YouTuber Mark Meechan, better known by his online name Count Dankula, and far-right conspiracy theorist Paul Joseph Watson. The trio's membership has been described by political analysts as part of a shift to the far-right in UKIP under Gerard Batten's leadership. In the European Parliament's 2019 elections in the United Kingdom, Benjamin was second on UKIP's list for the South West England constituency.  Benjamin was not elected, with his party getting only 3.22% of the vote in his native South West England constituency (a drop of 29.1% from 2014) and losing both of its seats in the region, as well as all twenty-two of its seats across the rest of Britain.

At a UKIP press conference announcing his candidacy, Benjamin once again refused to retract his comments about Phillips, saying "a decent person doesn't laugh about male suicide" and that he would apologise if Jess apologised for her position on men. Benjamin also stated that she was being a "giant bitch" for "laughing about male suicide" and so he was justified in being a "giant dick back". Philips had earlier mocked MP Philip Davies when he called for a debate for international men's day, citing increasing male suicides, lower life expectancy relative to women, and domestic violence. Phillips openly laughed and pulled faces while Davies spoke, which caused a social media outrage. Phillips had critiqued the idea of a "men's day" but also said that male suicide is a serious issue.

In response to the controversy, the chairman of the Swindon branch of UKIP called for Benjamin to be deselected, which was rejected by Batten. Later in the campaign, he made additional negative comments about Phillips, saying he might rape her but "nobody's got that much beer". He said this was a joke and was empowering to victims of rape because "it's a lot more empowering to not be controlled by jokes". The University of the West of England cancelled a hustings event for fears of disturbances and Exeter Cathedral banned him a few days later from a separate election event it was hosting.

In February 2020, Benjamin launched the group Hearts of Oak with British far-right activist Tommy Robinson and former UKIP members. Members of the group say that it is not a political party, but a "cultural movement" focused on "strong borders, immigration and national identity," "authorities privileging and protecting Islam alone," and "freedom of speech".

Political views 
Benjamin is an anti-feminist. He is also an advocate for Brexit and a critic of Islam. He has opposed online feminist movements such as the British group Reclaim the Internet, which he called "social communism". Following the 2014 Isla Vista killings, Benjamin said that social justice feminism was a "disease of the modern age" that had disenfranchised and radicalised young men, causing a rise in the number of mass murders. While on a panel in New York City in 2018, he said: "Jewish people, unfortunately for them, have got to drop the identity politics. I'm sorry about the Holocaust but I don't give a shit. I'm sorry." In May 2018, Benjamin was a speaker at a right-wing "Day of Freedom" rally in support of Tommy Robinson after Robinson was banned from Twitter for hate speech. At the rally, Benjamin voiced opposition to "totalitarianism, identity politics and Islamism".

News outlets and journalists have described Benjamin as right-wing and far-right. Vox has described him as anti-progressive. He has been described as alt-right by The Times and The Jewish Chronicle and has been linked to the alt-right by news media and researchers, including Newsweek, Salon, The Guardian, Wired UK, and Data & Society. The Daily Dot compared Benjamin to the alt-right due to his anti-feminism and criticisms of Islam and Black Lives Matter, frequent subjects for criticism by the alt-right. Vice and PC Magazine have described him as a conspiracy theorist. James Delingpole, writing for The Spectator, described him as a "leftist libertarian whose schtick is simply to question the received wisdoms of our time". Benjamin has described himself as a "classical liberal" or "English liberal" and has said that he opposes the alt-right. He has argued that the alt-right's authoritarian and collectivist thinking is a reaction to comparable racism against white people from the left. Benjamin has also described himself as a "skeptic". In the 2016 United States presidential election, Benjamin initially supported Bernie Sanders, later saying that Donald Trump was the lesser of two evils compared with Hillary Clinton.

Personal life 
Benjamin lives with his family in Swindon. He has stated that he is an atheist.

References

External links 

 

1979 births
Living people
British critics of Islam
British anti-communists
English atheists
English conspiracy theorists
English far-right politicians
English political commentators
English social commentators
English video bloggers
English YouTubers
Gamergaters
Male bloggers
Male critics of feminism
People from Swindon
UK Independence Party people
Video game commentators
YouTube controversies
Anti-Islam sentiment in the United Kingdom
YouTube critics and reviewers